Rolf Strandberg (4 August 1937 – 15 July 2011) was a Swedish ski jumper. He competed in the individual event at the 1960 Winter Olympics.

References

External links
 

1937 births
2011 deaths
Swedish male ski jumpers
Olympic ski jumpers of Sweden
Ski jumpers at the 1960 Winter Olympics
People from Örnsköldsvik Municipality
Sportspeople from Västernorrland County